Menjab or Manjab, also rendered as Menjav, may refer to:
 Menjab-e Jadid
 Menjab-e Qadim